The Star Aviation LoneStar Sport Helicopter is an American very light helicopter designed by Star Aviation Inc of New Braunsfels, Texas, for amateur construction.

The LoneStar was developed by Ken Rehler and Tom Carlson as a simple single-seat very light helicopter. Rehler formed Star Aviation to market the design in kit-form. The open-frame helicopter was powered by a  Rotax 582 piston engine.

Due to the death of Rehler, Star Aviation no longer produces and sells kits. The aircraft was later developed into the Redback Buzzard, but only one prototype was completed.

Specifications

See also

References

Notes

Bibliography

1990s United States helicopters
1990s United States civil utility aircraft